The 2000 Arizona State Sun Devils football team represented Arizona State University during the 2000 NCAA Division I-A football season. They were coached by Bruce Snyder who was fired at the end of the season.

Schedule

Season summary

Washington State

References

Arizona State
Arizona State Sun Devils football seasons
Arizona State Sun Devils football